Hale Hentges (born August 19, 1996) is a former American football tight end. He played college football at Alabama. He played for the Indianapolis Colts, Washington Redskins / Football Team, and Minnesota Vikings of the National Football League (NFL).

College career
A four-star recruit, Hentges committed to Alabama over offers from Auburn, Florida, Georgia, Iowa, LSU, Michigan, Ohio State, Oklahoma, Penn State, Texas, and Wisconsin, among many others.   During his collegiate career, which lasted from 2015-2018, he had 15 receptions for 124 yards and 6 touchdowns. His main role and proficiency for Alabama was run blocking, helping Derrick Henry run for 2,219 yards and 22 touchdowns in 2015. Henry would go on to win the Heisman Trophy that year.

Professional career

Indianapolis Colts
Hentges signed with the Indianapolis Colts as an undrafted free agent in 2019. After making the Colts initial 53-man roster, he was waived on October 5, 2019.

Washington Redskins / Football Team
On October 7, 2019, Hentges was claimed off waivers by the Washington Redskins. He caught his first and only career touchdown pass from Dwayne Haskins in Week 16 against the New York Giants. On September 5, 2020, Hentges was waived by Washington and signed to the practice squad the next day. He was released on September 17.

Indianapolis Colts (second stint)
On September 22, 2020, Hentges was signed to the Indianapolis Colts practice squad.

Minnesota Vikings
On December 10, 2020, Hentges was signed off the Colts' practice squad by the Minnesota Vikings. He announced his retirement from professional football on March 30, 2021.

Personal life
On January 12, 2019, Hentges married former Alabama volleyball player Shannon Mikesky.

References

External links
Alabama Crimson Tide bio

1996 births
Living people
Alabama Crimson Tide football players
American football tight ends
Indianapolis Colts players
Minnesota Vikings players
Players of American football from Missouri
Sportspeople from Jefferson City, Missouri
Washington Redskins players
Washington Football Team players